Evangeline Wiles is a Nigerian technology entrepreneur. She is the managing director of Kaymu, Nigeria.

References

Nigerian women in business
Nigerian business executives
Year of birth missing (living people)
Living people
Place of birth missing (living people)